Sax-a-Go-Go is the second album by Dutch alto saxophonist Candy Dulfer, released in 1993. It entered the US Billboard Top Contemporary Jazz Albums chart at No. 5 in February 1994, remaining on the chart for 31 weeks. The album peaked at number 77 in Australia. The album includes a version of Eugene McDaniels' Vietnam War protest song "Compared to What", and "I Can't Make You Love Me", a hit for Bonnie Raitt from her album Luck of the Draw (1991).

Track listing

 "2 Funky" (Ulco Bed) – 4:50
 "Sax-a-Go-Go" (featuring Easy Mo Bee) (Easy Mo Bee, Candy Dulfer) – 4:54
 "Mister Marvin" (Ulco Bed) – 5:33
 "Man in the Desert" (Candy Dulfer, Ulco Bed) – 5:37
 "Bob's Jazz" (Ulco Bed) – 4:53
 "Jamming" (Candy Dulfer, Ulco Bed) – 5:21
 "I Can't Make You Love Me" (Allen Shamblin, Mike Reid) – 4:35
 "Pick Up the Pieces" (Roger Ball, Hamish Stuart, White, Robbie McIntosh, Owen McIntyre, Malcolm Duncan, Alan Gorrie, Yze) – 4:12
 "Compared to What" (J Mac Daniels) – 5:56
 "Sunday Afternoon" (Prince) – 8:06

Track listing (US/Canada)
 "2 Funky" (Ulco Bed) – 4:50
 "Sax-a-Go-Go" (featuring Easy Mo Bee) (Easy Mo Bee, Candy Dulfer) – 4:54
 "Mister Marvin" (Ulco Bed) – 5:33
 "Man in the Desert" (Candy Dulfer, Ulco Bed) – 5:37
 "Bob's Jazz" (Ulco Bed) – 4:53
 "Jamming" (Candy Dulfer, Ulco Bed) – 5:21
 "I Can't Make You Love Me" (Allen Shamblin, Mike Reid) – 4:35
 "Pick Up the Pieces (Single Version)" (Roger Ball, Hamish Stuart, White, Robbie McIntosh, Owen McIntyre, Malcom Duncan, Alan Gorrie, Yze) – 4:02
 "Sunday Afternoon" (Prince) – 8:06
 "2 Funky (Radio Version)" (Ulco Bed) – 4:36

Personnel
Candy Dulfer – vocals, alto, tenor, baritone, and soprano saxophone
Ulco Bed – bass guitar, guitar, drums, percussion, vocals, keyboards
Frans Hendriks – percussion, drums

Sales and certifications

References

1993 albums
Candy Dulfer albums
Smooth jazz albums
Crossover jazz albums
Ariola Records albums